Effloresce is the debut studio album by British progressive/alternative rock band Oceansize. It was released on 29 September 2003. The record garnered considerable praise from critics.

Track listing
All songs written by Oceansize.

 "I Am the Morning" – 4:18
 "Catalyst" – 6:40
 "One Day All This Could Be Yours" – 4:19
 "Massive Bereavement" – 9:59
 "Rinsed" – 3:58
 "You Wish" – 6:00
 "Remember Where You Are" – 5:22
 "Amputee" – 5:32
 "Unravel" – 2:50
 "Women Who Love Men Who Love Drugs" – 8:30
 "Saturday Morning Breakfast Show" – 9:04
 "Long Forgotten" – 8:57

Trivia
The band chose the name Effloresce at random from a dictionary. Original titles for the album included Career and Mine Host, the latter of which is the name of a song on the band's next full-length album, Everyone Into Position.
The title of "Massive Bereavement" is a reference to The Day Today, where it is the name of a horse.
The piano line playing on Track 9, "Unravel," is an excerpt of the second piece, Le Gibet, from Maurice Ravel's Gaspard de la Nuit.
The title of "Women Who Love Men Who Love Drugs" was coined by bassist Jon Ellis, who saw the headline of the same name on the front of Cosmopolitan Magazine.

Personnel
Mike Vennart – guitar, vocals
Steve Durose – guitar, backing vocals
Richard 'Gambler' Ingram – guitar
Jon Ellis – bass, keyboards
Mark Heron – drums

Additional personnel
Chris Sheldon – production (with Oceansize), mixing
Adrian Newton – assistant engineer
Louis Read – assistant engineer
Dario Dendi – assistant engineer
Jack Clark – assistant engineer
Martin & Kimberly McCarrick – cello, violin, viola on "Massive Bereavement" and "Long Forgotten"
Claire Lemmon – backing vocals on "Massive Bereavement" and "Saturday Morning Breakfast Show"

References

External links
Lyrics
Album Lyrics

Oceansize albums
2003 debut albums
Albums produced by Chris Sheldon
Beggars Banquet Records albums